Radgoszcz may refer to the following places:
Radgoszcz, Greater Poland Voivodeship (west-central Poland)
Radgoszcz, Lesser Poland Voivodeship (south Poland)
Radgoszcz, Masovian Voivodeship (east-central Poland)